The Barbajada (also italianized as Barbagliata) is a popular Milanese sweet frothy drink, popular in the 19th century and the early decades of the 20th century but still occasionally served today.  It is made with whipped chocolate, milk and coffee in equal parts, along with any amount of sugar, and possibly topped with cream. It is served warm in winter, usually to accompany desserts such as the Panettone or other Milanese delicacies. In the past there was also a cold version served in summer.

Reportedly, the recipe was a creation of Domenico Barbaja (hence the name), who was at the time a garzone (waiter) in a café. The drink was so successful that Barbaja eventually grew rich enough to become a theatrical impresario as well as the owner of a café in the luxury venue of Piazza della Scala.

See also
 List of Italian dishes

References 
Notes

Sources
Eisenbeiss, Philip (2013), Bel Canto Bully: The Life of the Legendary Opera Impresario Domenico Barbaja. London: Haus Publishing, 2013  

Italian desserts
Cuisine of Lombardy
Chocolate drinks
Coffee in Italy